Julakanti Ranga Reddy (born 24 October 1958) is an Indian politician and former Member of Legislative Assembly for Miryalaguda Assembly Constituency, representing the Communist Party of India (Marxist). J Ranga Reddy has won in the Andhra Pradesh State Assembly Elections 2009 for CPI(M) in Miryalaguda Constituency.

Early life 

Reddy was born on 24 October 1958 in Kothaguda village, Thipparthy Mandal in the Nalgonda district in the Indian state of Andhra Pradesh. He is married to J Sujatha and they have a son and a daughter.

Political career 

He won the Miryalaguda Assembly constituency for three terms. He is the only CPI(M) member to win in the 2009 elections and was CPM's legislative leader.

Reddy undertook an indefinite hunger strike at Nereducharla for inordinate delays in relaying the road line between Neredcherla and Janpahad. Before launching the fast, he undertook a padayatra from Mahamkaligudem to Neredcherla, covering 26 km of the bumpy road.

References

External links 

 Gender quotas
 
 
 

Members of the Andhra Pradesh Legislative Assembly
Living people
1965 births
Communist Party of India (Marxist) politicians from Andhra Pradesh
Telugu politicians